Geoffrey Stephenson may refer to:
 Geoffrey D. Stephenson, Royal Air Force officer
 Geoffrey H. Stephenson, radar engineer